Paul Santo is an American Musician, Songwriter, Record Producer and Sound Recording Engineer, best known in the music industry for his work in the recording studio collaborating with "multi-platinum" recording artists like: Aerosmith, Eric Clapton, Kid Rock, David Gilmour of Pink Floyd, Ringo Starr and Ozzy Osbourne .

His work has also earned him several Grammy Award nominations.

In 2003, he won a Grammy® Award for his work as a sound engineer and musician, on the album "Soy," with Latin singer Alejandra Guzmán.

He also has a private consulting practice that mentors select individuals interested in pursuing a career in the music business as artists, music recording and production professionals, or session musicians.

His career in the music industry spans over several decades dating back to when he was just a teenager starting out and running his own recording studio in the town of Weymouth, Mass. It was there, on Boston's South Shore, where he eventually crossed paths with another well-known musician from the area, Steven Tyler of Aerosmith. The two hit it off and immediately formed long time relationship that was both from a personal and professional place. Santo, eventually started working with the band. First, as Steven Tyler and Joe Perry's personal sound engineer, and eventually, with the entire band. He is credited on several of the band's studio albums, both as a sound engineer and contributing musician.

During that time, he became known as one of the “Boneyard Boys” which is the small “tight knit” group of producers and collaborators who are behind Aerosmith's "creative process" when they are in studio, recording albums.

His work on those recordings eventually got him recognized in the music world and led to his working with other artists and producers in studios from Los Angeles to London.

His music career spans over several decades and is pan-optic of a full range of musical styles and genres, from rock and rhythm and blues to hip hop and country.

Santo played guitar with Aerosmith during their "Boston Strong" concert at TD Garden in Boston, Massachusetts, filling in for member Brad Whitford who was unable to make the show due to a family situation.

He also appeared on the recording of "Tears in Heaven". An "All-Star" benefit song for the victims of the devastating 2004 Indian Ocean earthquake, organized by Ozzy Osbourne and his family along with Mark Hudson.

Musical collaboration 
During his time in the music industry, Santo has worked (written, recorded, and/or performed) and continues to work, with a wide variety of musically diverse recording artists ranging from Ozzy Osbourne, to Michael Bolton, Alejandra Guzmán to Jonny Lang, as well as, Eric Carmen, Cheap Trick, Neko Case, Steve Smith, Bon Jovi, LeAnn Rimes, Santana, and the Backstreet Boys.

He has also worked “side by side” in the studio with such acclaimed music producers as: Desmond Child (nominated to the Songwriters Hall of Fame in 2008), Jack Douglas (Best known for working with The Who and John Lennon), and also, Grammy Award-winning record producer, songwriter, and musician Mark Hudson. Mark Hudson, along with Santo, is also a member of the infamous "Boneyard Boys", the small group of songwriters, musicians, and music producers responsible for the rock band Aerosmith's creative process.

Paul has also appeared on the Ozzy Osbourne album Under Cover(guitar), Ringo Starr's Ringo Rama (audio engineer, Pro Tools, guitar & keyboards) and Michael Bolton's Only a Woman Like You (Bass guitar, guitars, audio engineer, and Pro Tools) and many others as a musician, audio engineer, or both.

Santo has been nominated for several Grammy awards over the years for his work as a sound recording engineer and studio musician. Including, a nomination for “Best Rock Album” with Aerosmith for the album:  Just Push Play, which debuted at #2  on the Billboard 200.
and became certified platinum within a month of its release.

He also received another nomination that year for the Grammy Award for Best Rock Performance by a Duo or Group with Vocal for his work on "Jaded". which was a major Top 10 hit in the United States and around the world.

In 2009, he won a Latin Grammy Award for his collaboration with  Alejandra Guzmán on her ninth studio album titled Soy. It was also the first Latin Grammy for the singer/songwriter, also known as the “Bad Girl of Latin Pop” in her 30-year career.

Other notable awards include a TEC Award from the Naam Foundation for his work as an sound engineer for Sony Music.

The TEC Awards, often referred to as the "Oscars" of the pro audio and sound recording industry, includes such creative luminaries as Les Paul, Quincy Jones, Pete Townshend, and Stevie Wonder, as well as many other notable artists, who are acknowledged for their historical and influential contributions to the music world.

With Aerosmith 
The musical group that Santo has been most associated over the years is Aerosmith. His connection with the band dates back many years, to when he first met Steven Tyler, who like Santo, was also from the Boston area. They quickly formed a friendship and that eventually led to Paul working a longtime gig as the personal sound engineer for both Steven Tyler and Joe Perry. He also held the title of "house" sound engineer at the Pandora's Box recording studio.

As his relationships with the band members grew, so did his involvement on a professional level.

When the band went into the studio to record the albums: Just Push Play, Honkin' on Bobo, and Music from Another Dimension! for the Geffen Records label, he was brought in as a member of creative and production teams, working on various aspects of the process from sound engineer to session musician.

His work also earned him a spot as a member of the “Boneyard Boys”. A “tongue in cheek” name for the small group of collaborators behind the band's creative process which is in reference to Joe Perry's “state of art” home recording studio, aptly named the “Boneyard,” where the majority of the recording process took place. Other members of the group includes famed music producer Jack Douglas and Grammy Award-winning producer, Mark Hudson.

Most recently, in 2018, Santo was back in the studio with Steven Tyler.

This time, working with the lead singer on his first collection of solo music. He was responsible for the entire musical score, recording all of the background music, and even performing on the accompanying movie documentary, "Out on a Limb", which chronicles Tyler and the making of his new music.

{{quote box
| width = 95em
| title_bg = BlanchedAlmond
| title_fnt = SaddleBrown
| bgcolor = Cornsilk
| align = center
| title = Tom Hamilton of Aerosmith
| quote =

We actually have this guy, who's our pre-production assistant... A friend of ours named: Paul Santo.

He's such a brilliant musician... One of those kids that just got that "bolt of lightning..." You know, great on drums, great on guitar, great on piano... He's also the one who knows all about ProTools. 
He has helped me and Joey (Kramer) with preparing our bass and drum parts... During the writing process: Steven [Tyler], Joe [Perry], Marty Fredrickson and Mark Hudson would be recording, as they wrote, and these cool little demos would come out... Then, they would send them around to the rest of us. So we could prepare our take on it. It was great. 
Paul would come over and run the ProTools and help me record what I was practicing. So, I could hear what I was doing right, and doing wrong. He was not only able to run the ProTools for me, he would also give me suggestions that were essentially shortcuts to getting it all good. 
I think it's important to find a mentor, a teacher, or a Guru (whatever you want to refer to that person as.) They're not necessarily teaching you stuff you couldn't learn on your own... But, they shorten the process. Pointing things out that you might not see for six months or even six years. I recommend that to anyone playing an instrument, find someone who's a guru, like Paul is to us...I'm stopping just short of saying "take lessons,"here. I think a lot of teachers try to force you into a certain way of doing things, that you don't want to do – teachers sometimes do that.

You want someone that looks at what you do, sees that you have the potential to go in the right direction, and then show you how to find it, yourself.--Christopher Buttner--

interview for GlobalBass.com
}}

 With Joe Perry 
Santo's also a member of Joe Perry's solo band The Joe Perry Project playing rhythm guitar and keyboards. In 2009, he was back in the studio as audio engineer with Joe Perry working on Perry's 5th solo album Have Guitar, Will Travel, after plans to record Aerosmith's fifteenth studio album with producer Brendan O'Brien fell apart. The album was on Perry's label "Roman Records" and includes fellow Joe Perry Project members David Hull (bass) and Marty Richards on (drums). Santo is credited with playing Hammond organ, pipe organ, and percussion on the record. There was one new addition to the group, a young and relatively unknown German vocalist, named Hagan Grohe. He was discovered on YouTube by Joe Perry's wife, Billie and sings on four of the album's tracks.

The same group of musicians went on the road with the Perry on the Have Guitar, Will Travel Tour, The band opened up for national acts like Bad Company and Mötley Crüe, while also making an appearance as the musical guest on Late Night with David Letterman, performing "Slingshot" from the album with Santo stepping out from behind the keyboards to play guitar and Perry singing the lead vocals.
At the beginning of 2012, Santo (Hammond organ), along with Aerosmith guitarist Brad Whitford (Brass Synth Guitar), Warren Huart (Acoustic guitar), Jack Douglas (Drums), and Joe Perry (Electric and Slide Guitars, Bass, Vocal) recorded a "very cool" rendition" of the Bob Dylan classic "Man of Peace" for Chimes of Freedom in honor of Amnesty International USA.

They also performed the song on The Tonight Show with Jay Leno with Santo once again playing guitar with Perry.

 With Ringo Starr 
When former Beatles drummer Ringo Starr returned to the studio to begin work on his latest album Ringo Rama he brought back his longtime friend and producer, Mark Hudson. Who, in turn, brought in Paul Santo, who he had worked with previously on an Aerosmith album, as part of the production team.

This would be Ringo Starr's 13th studio album, and as is always the case with the former “Beatle,” he proved that he still had his "star power" in the music industry and brought in some of legendary names in music for the recording.

Musicians like David Gilmour, Eric Clapton, Willie Nelson, and Charlie Haden are just a few of the artists that stopped by.

Santo, working as the sound engineer, split time between recording at Starr's recording studio in London, Rocca Bella, and Hudson's Whatinthewhatthe? Studios in Los Angeles.

The sessions were produced by Starr, who also made a documentary of the making of “Ringo Rama”.

Santo, being an accomplished musician, also played multiple instruments on the album and co-wrote the song "I Think Therefore I Rock and Roll".

 "Tears in Heaven" 
Following the 2004 Indian Ocean Tsunami that devastated Southeast Asia, Paul Santo joined an all-star cast of musicians the included: Elton John, Rod Stewart, Steven Tyler, Ozzy Osbourne, Phil Collins, Ringo Starr, Gavin Rossdale, Gwen Stefani, Mary J. Blige, Pink, Kelly Osbourne, Katie Melua, Josh Groban, Andrea Bocelli and members of Velvet Revolver: Slash, Duff McKagan, Matt Sorum, Dave Kushner and Scott Weiland. The recording also featured actor Robert Downey Jr.to perform on a cover version of the Eric Clapton song "Tears in Heaven".

The collaboration was organized by Mark Hudson, Ozzy Osbourne, his wife Sharon, and daughter Kelly Osbourne for the Humanitarian response to the 2004 Indian Ocean earthquake with all sales from the recording going to benefit the victims and recovery.  Funds raised from the project went to the Save the Children charity.

 "Boston Strong" 
In response to the tragic Boston Marathon bombing in April 2013, a line-up of high-profile acts, with roots in the Boston area, performed to a sold-out crowd at the TD Garden for a “Boston Strong” benefit concert for the victims of the attack.

Aerosmith, headlined the show, which also featured local groups like the New Kids on the Block (Donnie Wahlberg was actually the one credited with concert idea.), The J. Geils band, featuring Peter Wolf, Jimmy Buffett and James Taylor, along with many others.

Aerosmith, which formed in the city back in 1970, has always been synonymous with the Boston throughout their entire career. Even being famously called the "Bad Boys from Boston" during their heyday. Members of the band raised their families in the area and still own homes in the suburbs of Boston.

Due to the urgent need, scheduling, and nature of the show, the promoters behind the concert had only a matter days to put the event together. (It also sold out all 19,600 seats in about 5 minutes.) Unfortunately, due to a family member undergoing a major surgery, Aerosmith guitarist Brad Whitford was unable to perform with the band at the event.

On very short notice and without any time for rehearsal, Paul Santo, who lives in the Boston area, stepped in with Aerosmith (who had just returned from a show in Singapore the day before) and took Whitford's place on stage with the rest of band.

The concert was considered a great success for the "One fund." Which was established almost immediately after the tragic event and before the concert had already raised $27 million for the victims.

 Composer for TV and film 

Steven Tyler documentary Out on a Limb: Composer, performer, Sound recording and reproduction
History channel American Pickers (TV series): Composer, performer, Sound recording and reproduction
Lifetime The March Sisters at Christmas (TV movie): Composer, performer, Sound recording and reproduction
National Geographic Fool's Gold (TV show): Composer, performer, Sound recording and reproduction
Discovery Channel Extreme Engineering (TV program): Composer, performer, Sound recording and reproduction
PBS Nova (TV program) "Making Stuff": Composer, performer, Sound recording and reproduction
Telemundo  The Nate Berkus Show and "Mi Corazon Insiste" : Composer, performer, Sound recording and reproduction
Animal Planet: Must Love Cats'' : Composer, performer, Sound recording and reproduction

Influences 
Santo's earliest musical influence was The Beatles, and though Frank Zappa and The Who factored equally later, he was influenced by far many and varied sources. His guitar style, while diverse, tends to be rooted in an amalgam of both English blues-rock players from the 1960s and 1970s and Fender Telecaster-playing American country players. Drumming is also rooted in Brits like Ringo Starr and Keith Moon but also American soul and funk drummers.

References

External links 

Aerosmith – Boston Strong Concert
Grammy Award Winning Artist Paul Santo Visits Music Students 2017
Paul Santo- Radio Interview
Paul Santo Airgigs Podcast Interview

American rock musicians
American audio engineers
American rock songwriters
Living people
Record producers from Massachusetts
Musical groups from Boston
People from Weymouth, Massachusetts
People from Marshfield, Massachusetts
Aerosmith
Year of birth missing (living people)